Mahendra is a Sanskrit compound word deriving from Maha (Highest position) and Indra Deva (the King of Gods) from Hindu mythology. It has been used in compound royal styles.

History and politics

Royalty 
 Mahendra or Mahinda – the son of Emperor Ashoka and a promoter of Buddhism
 Mahendravarman I – (Tamil: மகேந்திரவர்மன் 600–630 CE), Pallava king who ruled the Northern regions of what forms present-day Tamil Nadu in India in the early 7th century.
 Mahindu, 10th century Chahamana king of north-western India
 Mahendra of Nepal – king of Nepal from 1955 to 1972

Elected office 
 Mahinda Rajapaksa – President of Democratic Socialist Republic of Sri Lanka from 2005 to 2015
 Mahendra Chaudhry – Fijian politician and the leader of the Fiji Labour Party
 Upul Mahendra (born 1971), Sri Lankan politician

Entertainment

Film 
 Balu Mahendra – director of Tamil films
 Y. G. Mahendra – an Indian  actor, singer playwright and comedian

Music 
 Mahendra Kapoor – Bollywood singer

Sports 
 Mahendra Singh Dhoni – Indian cricketer, former Captain of Indian Cricket Team
 Mahendra Nagamootoo –  West Indian cricketer

Business 
 Mahendra Kumar 
 Mahendra Mehta

See also 
 Raja Mahendra, royal style; and name

Indian masculine given names